Robert James du Preez (born 19 July 1963 in Potchefstroom) is a former South African international rugby union player and former head coach of the  Super Rugby team. His regular position was scrum-half.

Playing career
Du Preez started his provincial career with Western Transvaal in 1982. He then moved to Northern Transvaal, where his regular halfback partner was Naas Botha. He ended his playing career with Natal.

Du Preez played seven test matches for the Springboks in 1992 and 1993. He also played in eight tour matches, scoring nine tries for the Springboks.

Test history

Coaching career

Personal

He also has two younger twin sons – Dan and Jean-Luc – that were both included in the South Africa Under-20 squad for the 2014 IRB Junior World Championship. All three sons were selected for the Sharks squad for the 2019 Super Rugby competition.

Accolades

Du Preez was also a South African Rugby Young Player of the Year nominee in 1987 and a South African Rugby Player of the Year nominee in 1989 and 1990.

See also

List of South Africa national rugby union players – Springbok no. 562

References

1963 births
Living people
Rugby union players from Potchefstroom
Rugby union scrum-halves
Sharks (Currie Cup) players
Sharks (rugby union) players
South Africa international rugby union players
South African rugby union coaches
South African rugby union players